Andrejs Butriks (born 20 December 1982 in Riga) is a former Latvian football forward, currently the sporting director of FK Ventspils in the Latvian Higher League.

Club career
Butriks played for FK Avots at youth level before signing for FK Ventspils in 2001. In 2002, he scored 14 goals in 24 games for the club, becoming a vital first eleven player in the next few years. Butriks played for FK Ventspils, until 2011, scoring more than 50 goals in 212 matches. While playing for Ventspils, in January 2008 Butriks had a trial period with Football League Championship club Blackpool in England, but didn't stay with the club. Seeking for a new club abroad after UEFA Europa League matches he joined FC Ceahlăul Piatra Neamţ in Romania on loan from FK Ventspils in February 2010. As this was a very unsuccessful period, Butriks didn't play even a match for the club and returned to Ventspils in June 2010. This being away period in Romania had left Butriks out of the team's starting eleven and he found it difficult to fit into the squad, mostly being a late game substitute. Unhappy with that time situation Andrejs left the club in April 2011, signing a contract with another Virsliga club FK Jūrmala-VV. Due to the club's unstable financial situation and poor results Butriks played only 9 league matches and managed to score twice. In July 2011 he left the team, signing a contract abroad in August 2011. This time a one-year contract in Greece with the newly promoted Anagennisi Epanomi, playing in the Greek Second League. Andrejs got himself injured against PAOK, playing just one league game and being released after the season. Following his release Butriks decided to retire from football.

In June 2012 he accepted an offer to become the sporting director of his former club FK Ventspils.

International career

In October 2007 Butriks was called up to the Latvia squad for their UEFA Euro 2008 qualifying Group F match against Iceland on 13 October, but he did not play in the match. He made his debut for Latvia on 17 October in their Euro 2008 qualifying match against Denmark, when he came on as a substitute in the 63rd minute. All in all, he collected 4 international appearances for Latvia.

Honours

Team
FK Ventspils
Virsliga Champion (3): 2006, 2007, 2008
Latvian Cup winner (4): 2003, 2004, 2005, 2007

Personal life

Butriks is married and has a son. His wife's name is Jūlija, while the son's name is Artjoms.

References

External links
 
 
 

1982 births
Living people
Footballers from Riga
Latvian footballers
Latvia international footballers
FK Ventspils players
CSM Ceahlăul Piatra Neamț players
Liga I players
Expatriate footballers in Romania
Latvian expatriate sportspeople in Romania
Latvian expatriate footballers
Expatriate footballers in Greece
Association football forwards